Intercity Istanbul Park, also known as the Istanbul Racing Circuit or initially as the Istanbul Otodrom, is a motor sports race track in the Tuzla district of Istanbul, Turkey. Designed by Hermann Tilke, it opened on 19–21 August 2005. It has been called "the best race track in the world" by former Formula One Chief Executive Bernie Ecclestone, who held the managing rights of the circuit between 2007 and 2011. The circuit has been currently managed by the Turkish company Intercity since 2012.

Description

The venue of the Turkish Grand Prix is located in the crossing of boundaries of Pendik and Tuzla districts on the Asian side of Istanbul, close to the junction of Kurtköy on the north side of the O–4 motorway, linking Istanbul to Ankara; and close to the junction of Istanbul Park on the south side of the O–7 motorway. It is near Sabiha Gökçen International Airport and is surrounded by forests and fields.

The Istanbul Park racing circuit was one of only seven circuits running anticlockwise in the 2021 Formula One season, the others being the Imola Circuit (used for the Emilia Romagna Grand Prix), the Baku City Circuit (used for the Azerbaijan Grand Prix), Circuit of the Americas (used for the United States Grand Prix), the Interlagos Circuit (used for the Brazilian Grand Prix), the Jeddah Corniche Circuit (used for the Saudi Arabian Grand Prix), and the Yas Marina Circuit (used for the Abu Dhabi Grand Prix). This unusual anti-clockwise layout leads to increased strain on the other side of the driver's neck than they would experience at most other circuits, especially through the long high-speed left-hander at turn 8.

The track can hold about 125,000 spectators. The main grandstand has a seating capacity of 25,000 spectators, with natural ground stands and temporary stands allowing for around 100,000 more. The paddock buildings are two-level structures; the ground floor reserved for racing teams, the upper floor serving as hospitality areas with 5,000 seats. At each end of the paddock, there are two 7-story VIP towers.

Turn 8 (nicknamed "Diabolica" by some in reference to Monza's Curva Parabolica) particularly caught the imagination. The corner is a fast, sweeping corner with four apexes, similar to one of the multi-apex sections of the old Nürburgring. Spectators and drivers alike raved about Turn 8, comparing it to legendary corners such as Eau Rouge and 130R. The corner eventually became the basis of some of Tilke's newer track turns, such as turns 17 and 18 at the Circuit of the Americas, turn 3 at the Sochi Autodrom, and Buddh International Circuit's turns 10 to 11. The high loads exerted through this corner contribute to the circuit's reputation for rapid tyre wear.

Another notable corner is Turn 1, a sharp downhill left-hander immediately after the front straight. This corner has been nicknamed by some as the "Turkish Corkscrew" in reference to the famous Corkscrew at WeatherTech Raceway Laguna Seca. Both the 2006 F1 and MotoGP races at the circuit featured multiple incidents at this corner. A third noteworthy area is the uphill kink in the middle of the back straight; due to its similarity to Eau Rouge, it has been jokingly referred to as "Faux Rouge".

The circuit is not, however, without its critics. After qualifying, Jenson Button claimed that the track was getting bumpier as the weekend went on, particularly at Turn 8, which was what caused so many drivers to spin off. This harks back to another circuit designed by Hermann Tilke, Shanghai International Circuit, which is said to be sinking in places because it was built on the site of a former swamp. Jarno Trulli was notable for his lukewarm feeling towards the circuit, saying that he felt the circuit was easy to learn, and that good performance was down more to the car than the driver.

Major motorsport events

Formula One

The first Grand Prix of Turkey took place in 2005. Due to financial disagreement, the last Turkish Grand Prix took place in 2011, despite earlier reports that the event would take place until at least 2021. F1 cars equipped with the smaller 2.4-litre V8 engines (instead of the 3.0-litre V10s of previous years) reached  in 2006. Felipe Massa has an affinity with this circuit, with the Brazilian winning three of the nine Grands Prix held at Istanbul Park with Lewis Hamilton winning two and Sebastian Vettel, Jenson Button, Kimi Räikkönen and Valtteri Bottas having won one race each.

Istanbul Park returned for the 2020 Formula One World Championship, after a nine-year absence.

Istanbul Park was due to replace the cancelled Canadian Grand Prix for the 2021 Formula One World Championship. Then it was postponed indefinitely due to Covid-19 travel restrictions imposed on the country by the UK government and was replaced by the Styrian Grand Prix. It was later re-added to the 2021 calendar in place of the cancelled Singapore Grand Prix.

GP2
In 2006, the winner of the GP2 race was Nelson Piquet Jr., however the real battle was with Lewis Hamilton who, at the beginning of the race, spun off and dropped right down the field from 2nd to 16th. However he raced his way back through the pack with some spectacular overtaking moves to finish in second.

Fifteen racers completed the race in 2009 while eleven drivers were not classified. The winner was Russian Vitaly Petrov of Barwa Addax, who moved up to second place in the championship table with 29 points ahead of Jérôme d'Ambrosio having 18 points. Petrov's teammate Romain Grosjean, who retired from the race, was leading the championship with 31 points. The Italians Luca Filippi of Super Nova Racing and Davide Valsecchi of Durango finished second and third in the race.

MotoGP

MotoGP raced at Istanbul Park for three years between 2005 and 2007. Marco Melandri won the races in 2005 and 2006 with the 2007 race being won by Casey Stoner. After the venue was taken over by now ex-Formula One chief executive Bernie Ecclestone in 2007, the venue was dropped from the 2008 calendar.

Other motorsport events
The first leg of the 2012 FIA European Truck Racing Championship was held on 13 May 2012 at Istanbul Park. The Superbike World Championship raced at the track in 2013. The FIA World Rallycross Championship has organized the World RX of Turkey at Istanbul Park in 2014 and 2015, using an area to the outside of turns 12, 13, 14.

Events

 Former

 Deutsche Tourenwagen Masters (2005)
 European Truck Racing Championship (2012)
 F3000 International Masters (2006)
 Ferrari Challenge Europe (2014)
 FIA GT Championship FIA GT Istanbul 2 Hours (2005)
 FIA World Rallycross Championship World RX of Turkey (2014–2015)
 Formula Alfa Championship (2014–2015)
 Formula-G (2005–2006)
 Formula One Turkish Grand Prix (2005–2011, 2020–2021)
 GP2 Series (2005–2011)
 GP3 Series (2010–2011)
 Grand Prix motorcycle racing Turkish motorcycle Grand Prix (2005–2007)
 International GT Open (2006)
 Le Mans Series 1000 km Istanbul (2005–2006)
 Porsche Carrera Cup Germany (2005)
 Porsche Supercup (2007–2009, 2011)
 Superbike World Championship Istanbul Park World SBK round (2013)
 World Series by Renault (2006)
 World Touring Car Championship FIA WTCC Race of Turkey (2005–2006)

Lap records
The official lap record for the current circuit layout is 1:24.770, set by Juan Pablo Montoya during the 2005 Turkish Grand Prix. While the unofficial all-time track record is 1:22.868, set by Lewis Hamilton in the qualifying of the 2021 Turkish Grand Prix. The official race lap records at the Intercity Istanbul Park are listed as:

See also
 List of Formula One circuits
 List of Grand Prix motorcycle circuits
 List of Superbike World Championship circuits
 List of FIA World Touring Car Championship circuits
 List of European Le Mans Series circuits
 List of World Rallycross Championship events

References

External links

 Intercity Istanbul Park homepage
 Istanbul Park Circuit on Google Maps

Formula One circuits
Grand Prix motorcycle circuits
Superbike World Championship circuits
World Touring Car Championship circuits
World Rallycross circuits
Sports venues in Istanbul
Motorsport venues in Turkey
Turkish Grand Prix
2005 establishments in Turkey
Tuzla, Istanbul
Racing circuits designed by Hermann Tilke
Sports venues completed in 2005